Bischofsheim may refer to the following towns:

Bischofsheim, Hesse, in Hesse, Germany
Maintal-Bischofsheim, a district of the city of Maintal in Hesse, Germany
Bischofsheim in der Rhön, in Bavaria, Germany
Bischoffsheim, in Bas-Rhin, France